Automation is the process of self-reliability.

Automation may also refer to:

Computing 

 Build automation, the use of managed make tools
 Business process automation, streamlining business operations with software
 Document automation, the use of software to streamline document creation
 Electronic design automation, software filling in details of circuit design
 Office automation, software assisting employees in performing job duties
 OLE Automation, the mechanism whereby applications can access and manipulate shared automation objects that are exported by other applications.
 Robotic process automation, automating tasks in back-end and front-end systems directly in the GUI 
 Support automation, automating problem prevention and resolution processes solutions
 Test automation, simulation of user actions to automate software testing

Others 

 Automation (video game), a 2015 game for Windows
 The Automation, a 2014 novel by an anonymous author using the pen names B.L.A. and G.B. Gabbler
 Broadcast automation, scheduling of broadcasts carried out automatically
 Building automation, regulating environmental parameters for human-occupied buildings
 Console automation, using motorized faders of an audio workstation to automate signal changes
 Home automation, regulating environmental parameters for private occupances
 Laboratory automation, automation of laboratory tasks

See also
 Automaton (disambiguation)
 Automate (disambiguation)